is a former Japanese football player and manager. He played for Japan national team.

Club career
Yoshida was born in Shizuoka Prefecture on February 11, 1958. After graduating from Hosei University, he joined Furukawa Electric in 1980. In 1981, he scored 14 goal and became a top scorer. In 1985-86, he became a top scorer again and he was selected Japanese Footballer of the Year awards. The club also won the league champions. In Asia, the club won 1986 Asian Club Championship. This is the first Asian champions as Japanese club. He retired in 1990.

National team career
On February 8, 1981, Yoshida debuted for Japan national team against Malaysia. He also played at 1982 Asian Games. He played 9 games and scored 1 goal for Japan until 1983.

Coaching career
After retirement, Yoshida started coaching career at Shimizu S-Pulse. From 2000s, he mainly coached women's team. Through Japan women's national team coach, he became a manager for Japan U-17 women's national team in 2007. He managed at U-17 World Cup 3 times (2008, 2010 and 2012). At 2010 U-17 World Cup, Japan won the 2nd place. He also became a manager Japan U-20 women's national team in 2011. He managed at 2012 U-20 World Cup and Japan won the 3rd place. In 2014, he signed with AS Elfen Saitama and managed in 2015 season.

Club statistics

National team statistics

Honors

Personal honors
Japan Soccer League First Division Top Scorer - 1981, 1985–86
Japanese Footballer of the Year - 1985

Managers honors
AFC U-16 Women's Championship - 2011
AFC U-19 Women's Championship - 2011

References

External links

Japan National Football Team Database

1958 births
Living people
Hosei University alumni
Association football people from Shizuoka Prefecture
Japanese footballers
Japan international footballers
Japan Soccer League players
JEF United Chiba players
Japanese football managers
Footballers at the 1982 Asian Games
Association football forwards
Asian Games competitors for Japan